Stenidea niveopicta is a species of beetle in the family Cerambycidae. It was described by Demelt in 1982. It is known from the Canary Islands.

References

niveopicta
Beetles described in 1982